"Mi Vida Loca (My Crazy Life)" is a song co-written and recorded by American country music artist Pam Tillis. It was released in November 1994 as the third single from the album, Sweetheart's Dance. She co-wrote the song with Jess Leary, and co-produced it with Steve Fishell. The song is Tillis' only number-one single on the Billboard country charts and earned her a second nomination for the Grammy Award for Best Female Country Vocal Performance.

Background and writing
Tillis said the idea for the song came when she was watching the talk show Geraldo and saw a guest with a tattoo reading "mi vida loca", which is Spanish for "my crazy life". She presented the idea to co-writer Jess Leary, who came up with a "Tex-Mex/salsa kind of groove". Leary was initially unsure if the song's title would present difficulty to radio programmers.

Critical reception
Deborah Evans Price, of Billboard magazine reviewed the song favorably, saying that the song has a "south-of-the-border Bo Diddley feel."

Music video
The music video was directed by Roger Pistole and premiered in late 1994.

Personnel
Compiled from album liner notes.
 Dan Dugmore — acoustic guitar
 John Barlow Jarvis — accordion
 John Jorgenson — electric guitar, mandolin, acoustic guitar solo
 Greg Leisz — steel guitar
 Suzi Ragsdale — background vocals
 Milton Sledge — drums
 Harry Stinson — percussion
 Pam Tillis — lead vocals, background vocals
 Biff Watson — acoustic guitar
 Willie Weeks — bass guitar

Chart positions
"Mi Vida Loca (My Crazy Life)" debuted at number 55 on the U.S. Billboard Hot Country Singles & Tracks for the week of November 19, 1994.

Year-end charts

References

1994 singles
1994 songs
Pam Tillis songs
Arista Nashville singles
Songs written by Pam Tillis